Nyarutarama is an affluent suburb of Kigali, Rwanda. The area is well developed with modern roads, sidewalks and street lighting.  
One of the key features of the suburb is "Lover's Lake" in the "Nyarutarama" valley, bordering on "Kigali Golf Course" to the west. The lake is surrounded by a walking track set within lush green vegetation and abundant bird life. 

Nyarutarama is primarily an upscale residential area especially favoured by embassy and high commission residences, but also has a number of services including good restaurants, a shopping centre and a large International Baccalaureate Diploma Program international school, Green Hills Academy.

Kigali